The Nuclear power station Oskarshamn is one of three active nuclear power stations in Sweden. All reactors were built using BWR technology.

Unit 1 had an installed output of 494 MW and Unit 2 664 MW; these are now decommissioned. Unit 3, the newest reactor block at the facility, has an installed output of 1,450 MW.

Clab, the temporary storage facility for spent nuclear fuel from all Swedish reactors, is also located at the site.

Operator
The responsible utility is OKG, short for the Oskarshamnsverkets Kraftgrupp OKG, which was acquired by Sydkraft in 1993, (later: E.ON Sverige). Uniper owns 54.5% and the other partner Fortum 45.5% of OKG.

History
On July 25, 2006, Units 1 and 2 were shut down as a precaution after a safety-related incident at an identical reactor at the Forsmark plant. The incident related to a failure of diesel generators to automatically start up when required, after a blackout caused by a shortcut at the grindgear sections at the plant. Modifications were later made to all the plants to address the issue.

On May 21, 2008, a welder tested positive for trace elements of explosives on a carrier bag and his hand at the entrance security check. The same evening Reactor 1 of the facility was shut down to allow bomb teams to sweep the facility. With police investigations ongoing, Kalmar police spokesperson Sven-Erik Karlsson confirmed to the TT news agency that a welder on his way in to the plant on Wednesday morning was caught with a relatively small amount of a highly explosive substance. The substance was later shown to be from nail polish and the event had no relevance to the operation of the plant or nuclear safety.

During 2010 Unit 2 underwent power and security upgrades. Unit 3 was after many upgrades the most powerful BWR in the world at approximately 1450 MWe. Due to the upgrade, the reactor had been on and off the grid with prolonged maintenance outages throughout 2010. Unit 2 will be upgraded in several steps and will reach maximum capacity of thermal power 2,300 MW and 840 MWe in 2011.

On September 30, 2013, a portion of the plant (the third reactor) was closed when a group of jellyfish clogged the cooling water intake pipes. It was not indicated as to whether the event had been classified as a safety disturbance yet, and to what level on the scale used for nuclear plants.

A decision on premature shutdown of units 1 and 2 was made in 2015. The decision entails that there will be no future investments at unit 2 and the reactor will not be restarted.

Unit 1 was originally set for decommissioning on June 29, 2017, but it was closed prematurely due to an "operational disturbance" on June 17, 2017. It was decided not to restart the unit ahead of the shutdown scheduled for June 29, 2017.

In December 2018 a strategy was outlined for the "radiological demolition" of units 1 and 2 to be carried out between 2020 and 2028. This will allow the land to be used for other nuclear power related purposes.

The site has its own hydrogen production as the coolant for all 3 reactors, capable of making 12 kg per day. With the closure of reactor 1 and 2, surplus capacity is available, and an agreement to supply so-called pink hydrogen to gas company Linde was made in January 2022.

See also 

Nuclear power in Sweden
List of power stations in Sweden
Template:Sweden nuke plant map

References

External links 
 http://www.okg.se/

Oskarshamn
Radioactive waste repositories
Nuclear power stations in Sweden
Uniper
Companies based in Kalmar County
Fortum